This is a list of defunct airlines of Russia.

See also
 List of airlines of Russia
 List of airports in Russia

References

Russia
Airlines
Airlines, defunct